
The Bright Young Things, or Bright Young People, was a nickname given by the tabloid press to a group of Bohemian young aristocrats and socialites in 1920s London. They threw flamboyant fancy dress parties, went on elaborate treasure hunts through nighttime London, and some drank heavily or used drugs — all of which was enthusiastically covered by journalists such as Charles Graves and Tom Driberg.  They inspired a number of writers, including Nancy Mitford (Highland Fling), Anthony Powell (A Dance to the Music of Time), Henry Green (Party Going), Dorothy Sayers (Murder Must Advertise), and the poet John Betjeman. Evelyn Waugh's 1930 novel Vile Bodies, adapted as the 2003 film Bright Young Things, is a satirical look at this scene.  Cecil Beaton began his career in photography by documenting this set, of which he was a member.

The most prominent members of the group included:

 Harold Acton
 Patrick Balfour, Baron Kinross
 Cecil Beaton
 John Betjeman
 Edward Burra
 Robert Byron
 Sheila Chisholm
 Daphne Fielding
 Edward Gathorne-Hardy
 Terence Greenidge
 Bryan Guinness
 Gavin Henderson
 Brian Howard
 Arthur Jeffress
 Teresa Jungman
 Zita Jungman
 Barbara Ker-Seymer
 Oliver Messel
 Diana Mitford
 Nancy Mitford
 Beverley Nichols
 Brenda Dean Paul
 Babe Plunket Greene
 David Plunket Greene
 Olivia Plunket Greene
 Richard Plunket Greene
 Elizabeth Ponsonby
 Loelia Ponsonby
 Anthony Powell
 Elizabeth Russell
 Edith Sitwell
 Osbert Sitwell
 Sacheverell Sitwell
 Eleanor Smith
 David Tennant
 Stephen Tennant
 Henry Thynne
 William Walton
 Sylvia Townsend Warner
 Evelyn Waugh
 Rex Whistler
 Sunday Wilshin
 Olivia Wyndham
 Henry Yorke

List of 'Bright Young Things' and their associates
The following is a list of the Bright Young Things themselves, their friends, acquaintances and associates of the period, many of whom were the basis for characters in the novels written by members of the group such as Evelyn Waugh, Anthony Powell and Nancy Mitford, as indicated in the table below.

References

Sources
 (U.S edition)
(British edition)

External links
 Bright Young Things (2003), IMDb.com; Written and directed by Stephen Fry, based on Evelyn Waugh's novel Vile Bodies

1920s in London
British slang
English culture
History of subcultures
Social class subcultures
Social groups
Stereotypes
Social class in the United Kingdom
Upper class culture in Europe